The unsuccessful French Farman F.200  of 1923 shared its type name with the 1929 Farman F.200, the progenitor of a series of parasol wing tourers. It was a two-seat touring aircraft, with a low, thick, cantilever wing. Only one was built and only briefly tested.

Design and development

Farman had previously designed and built monoplanes like the Farman Moustique, but this had an externally wire braced wing. The all wood F.200 was their first attempt to make an internally braced, cantilever monoplane. This provided a wing area high enough to support the F.200's considerable loaded weight within an achievable span.

Its weight required a powerful engine and the F.200 had a  water-cooled Hispano-Suiza 8Ab V-8, mounted over the wing leading edge. Its radiator was in the nose between the engine and propeller, only just ahead of the wing and its fuel tank was in the wing centre-section. Behind the engine the fuselage had a rectangular section with an enclosed cabin containing two seats in tandem over the wing. The cabin roof line merged into a fairing which reached back to the triangular vertical tail, its fin carrying an unbalanced rudder that went down to the keel. The horizontal tail, mounted on the top of the fuselage, was rectangular in plan; its unbalanced elevators had a cut-out for the rudder.

Each mainwheel was on a cranked axle from the corners of the fuselage, with a rubber shock absorber at the apex of a vertical V-strut from the wing spars. There was a small tailskid.

The Farman F.200 was on display, unflown, on the Farman stand in the 1922 Paris Salon, where its unusual appearance attracted attention, but it rapidly disappeared from the French contemporary journals. There are two accounts of its development, one contemporary and one from the late 20th century, which strongly conflict. In J. Liron's 1984 account it was not flown until May and then as a single-seater since in earlier tests it was unable to take-off with two aboard; worse, the May tests showed it to be totally uncontrollable as the thick wing root, close to the propeller, blanked the tail from the slipstream and prop wash. Liron does not say if the lack of control was at take-off or in flight.

Specification

References

Bibliography

Farman aircraft
1920s French sport aircraft
Parasol-wing aircraft
Single-engined tractor aircraft
Aircraft first flown in 1923